Katsuhiko Haida was a Japanese film actor and music composer. He played an important role in the 1951 film Tokyo File 212. He also appeared in The Burning Sky, and Escapade From Japan. His brother is Yukihiko Haida, and they formed the Nihon Ukulele Association together.

References

External links
 
 

1911 births
1982 deaths
People from Honolulu
Japanese male film actors
Japanese musicians
Japanese film producers